Millwall Junction was a railway station in Poplar, east London, on the London and Blackwall Railway (LBR).

Location
Despite the name, it was not in Millwall, but rather it marked where the LBR southern branch to Millwall and North Greenwich, which served the West India Docks, branched off the main line.

History
Millwall Junction was opened on 18 December 1871, the same time as the LBR's southern branch down to Millwall Docks opened, with three platforms – two on the line to Blackwall and a single one serving the branch line towards North Greenwich. The station was rebuilt in 1888 and remained open until 4 May 1926 when all passenger services on the LBR east of Stepney station (now Limehouse) were withdrawn, and Millwall Junction was closed. Goods services ran through until the 1960s. The station buildings were demolished in 1965 and the platforms removed in 1985 to make way for the Docklands Light Railway (DLR). The DLR's junction east of Poplar now occupies the station site.

References

Subterranea Britannica page

Buildings and structures demolished in 1965
Disused railway stations in the London Borough of Tower Hamlets
Railway stations in Great Britain opened in 1871
Railway stations in Great Britain closed in 1926
Former London and Blackwall Railway stations